is a 1967 Japanese yakuza film directed by Takashi Nomura for the Nikkatsu Corporation. It is based on the novel Tobosha by Shinji Fujihara.

It stars Joe Shishido as a hitman and Jerry Fujio as his partner; reprising his usual roles of contract killer, Shishido's performance in the film launched him beyond doubt as a hard boiled action hero, not only in Japan but in the whole genre, and remains his personal favourite of the most of 100 films he made at Nikkatsu.

The film was strongly influenced by French New Wave and crime films directors such as Jean-Pierre Melville, Jacques Becker or Henri Decoin and by Sergio Leone-style westerns. Nomura's use of still shots in the opening sequence has been compared to manga art techniques.

This film was made available in North America when Janus Films released a special set of Nikkatsu Noir films as part of the Criterion Collection, also including I Am Waiting, Rusty Knife, Take Aim at the Police Van, and Cruel Gun Story.

Plot
Contract killer Shuji Kamimura (Joe Shishido) and his partner Shun Shiozaki (Jerry Fujio) are hired by yakuza boss Senzaki to eliminate a former partner, Boss Shimazu, who has embezzled from an international co-op between both men. Kamimura successfully assassinates Boss Shimazu at his home while meeting with Senzaki. Kamimura and Shun attempt to leave the country by plane, but are waylaid and kidnapped by Shimazu's men. The duo escapes by stopping their car with specially-designed second brake behind the driver's seat that Shun had installed earlier, which kills Shimazu's men. Senzaki's lieutenant Nozaki orders them to hide out at a truck stop, the Hotel Nagisakan, to wait for further instructions. Later that night, more gunmen under Shimazu's lieutenant, following information from fellow yakuza boss Tsugawa arrive to kill them, but do not find the duo as they have escaped by bribing one of the patrons to take them to another motel.

The next day, the chief of Shimazu's men attempts to kill the duo by intercepting them and ordering their ferry that was supposed to be their getaway vehicle to depart early; this fails when Kamimura and Shun show up in the truck they rode in from the previous night and run over the hitman, but the ferry has already left. Returning to the Nagisakan, Kamimura drugs Shun with a sleeping pill while Mina, the motel's waitress, directs him to a freighter captain willing to smuggle the three out of the country. However, Tsugawa manages to broker a peace deal between Senzaki and Shimazu's son, who has succeeded his father as boss. The two settle their differences and decide to have Kamimura eliminated. Shun is later kidnapped at the Nagisakan, and when Mina arrives to pick him up and her belongings, is told by Senzaki by phone to have Kamimura meet with one of his henchmen. Later, Mina returns to Kamimura and tries to leave without Shun, but one of Senzaki's men arrives. Kamimura then negotiates to have Shun released in exchange for himself in three hours' time.

The exchange goes as planned, and the ship leaves without Kamimura, who arranges to meet with Senzaki and Shimazu at a landfill the next morning for his execution. Kamimura then spends the rest of the day planning on how to fight off the gunmen, spying on them testing various weapons on a special car with bulletproof windows, which Senzaki, Shimazu, and Tsugawa plan to use to safely watch Kamimura's execution. Kamimura then builds a bomb from several dynamite sticks with stopwatch as a timer; he also digs a ditch in the landfill where he plans to hide it. Shortly after finishing the ditch, he is beset by hitmen and fends them off. The car carrying Senzaki, Shimazu, and Tsugawa then moves to run him over with a gunman in the front trying to shoot Kamimura. Kamimura is hit several times but when the car is almost upon him, he dives into the ditch and plants the bomb under the car, which explodes, killing all its occupants. An injured Kamimura then briefly surveys the carnage before limping away as the film ends.

Cast
 Joe Shishido as Shuji Kamimura
 Jerry Fujio as Shun Shiozaki
 Chitose Kobayashi as Mina
 Shoki Fukae as Funaki
 Hideaki Esumi as Senzaki
 Jun Hongo as Kaneko
 Akio Miyabe as Miyoshi
 Toyoko Takechi as Otatsu
 Zenji Yamada as barge captain
 Kanjuro Arashi as Shimazu
 Ryōtarō Sugi as Shimazu's successor
 Kojiro Kusanagi as hitman
 Takamaru Sasaki as Otawara
 Asao Uchida as Tsugawa
 Zeko Nakamura as apartment receptionist

References

External links
 
 
 A Colt Is My Passport  at the Japanese Movie Database

1967 films
Japanese black-and-white films
1960s crime thriller films
1960s Japanese-language films
Japanese neo-noir films
Nikkatsu films
Yakuza films
1960s Japanese films